The 1915 Transylvania Pioneers football team represented Transylvania University during the 1915 Southern Intercollegiate Athletic Association football season. Led by third-year head coach Willis T. Stewart, the Pioneers compiled an overall record of 7–1–1 with a mark of 3–0–1 in SIAA play.

Schedule

References

Transylvania
Transylvania Pioneers football seasons
Transylvania Pioneers football